Jaxon Emmett Buell (August 27, 2014 – April 1, 2020) was an American child known for being born missing about 80% of his brain due to microhydranencephaly. He surpassed doctors' expectations, who predicted he would not live to be one year old. He lived for five years. When he turned one year old, his parents began posting updates about him on social media, which gained attention.

Buell was born on August 27, 2014, in Orlando, Florida. His disorder was discovered during his mother Brittany's pregnancy. They were given the option of an abortion, but it was declined by the parents.

He died in North Carolina on April 1, 2020, due to complications from his condition. He was 5 years old.

References 

American children
2014 births
2020 deaths
People with microcephaly
People from Orlando, Florida
Neurological disease deaths in North Carolina

Child deaths